Chuon Saodi is the former minister for agriculture of Cambodia.

References

Year of birth missing (living people)
Cambodian politicians
Agriculture ministers
Possibly living people
Government ministers of Cambodia